Farewell and Remember Me is an album by The Boys of the Lough, released in 1987.

There are 4 songs and 6 instrumental tracks on the album which is unusual in giving so much prominence to the uilleann bagpipes. It is sometimes considered to be the best album by The Boys of the Lough. The tunes are mainly sourced from Irish and Scottish traditions, some of them never previously recorded.

Track listing 
 "Sean But/ Tommy People's/ The Lark in the Morning" (jigs) (All traditional) 
 "The Leitrim Queen" (song) (Ian Burns) 
 "Lucky Can Du Link Ony/ Pottinger's/ Billy Nicholson" (reels) (Trad/ Tom Anderson/ Trad) 
 "Farewell and Remember Me" (song) (J Chalmers) 
 "Angus Polka no 1/ Angus Polka No 2/ Donegal Barn Dance" (All trad) 
 "An Spailpin Fanach (sung in Gaelic)/ The One-Horned Buck" (reel) (Trad/ Trad) 
 "Valentia Harbour (air)/ The Jug of Punch (reel)/ MacArthur Road" (reel) (All trad) 
 "Lovely Ann" (unaccompanied song) (Trad) 
 "The Holly Bush/ The New Ships Are Sailing" (reels) (All trad) 
 "The Waterford Waltz/ The Stronsay Waltz" (Trad/ Trad)

The listing above is as printed on the album package. Compare: a more complete and correct track listing at irishtune.info.

Personnel 
Aly Bain - fiddle
Cathal McConnell - flute, whistle, vocals
Dave Richardson - concertina, mandolin, cittern
Christy O'Leary - uilleann pipes, whistle, vocals
John Coakley - guitar, piano, bodhran, mandoline, fiddle
Guest: Ron Shaw - cello on "Farewell and Remember Me"
Engineered by Alistair George

The Boys of the Lough albums
1987 albums